Home for the Holidays is a 1972 American made-for-television slasher film directed by John Llewellyn Moxey, produced by Aaron Spelling and starring Sally Field, Eleanor Parker, Julie Harris, Jessica Walter and Walter Brennan which premiered on ABC on November 28, 1972. The plot focuses on a wealthy father on his deathbed who invites his four daughters home for Christmas and tells them he suspects his second wife of poisoning him. Shortly after, the girls learn that their stepmother was accused of killing her first husband, and they begin to fall prey to a killer dressed in a yellow rain slicker.

Plot
A wealthy invalid, Benjamin Morgan (Walter Brennan), believes his second wife, Elizabeth (Julie Harris), is trying to poison him. Alex (Eleanor Parker), his daughter, believes him. Thus, she summons her three sisters—Freddie, Jo, and Chris—to the Morgan farmhouse for Christmas. When they arrive, Mr. Morgan calls them to his room. He urges them to kill Elizabeth before she kills them. Later, as Elizabeth prepares dinner, Freddie's screams are heard from upstairs. The sisters find a drunken Freddie (Jessica Walter) clutching a glass of vodka, a shard of glass cutting into her other hand. They calm Freddie before putting her to bed. Later that night, a storm kicks up, influencing Jo to ask for the loan of Alex's car to travel to the local train station. After bidding all goodbye, she approaches the car and suddenly becomes victim to a mysterious figure in a yellow rain slicker, wielding a pitchfork. Later that evening, Freddie resumes her vodka supper, passing out in a warm bath. Soon, the intruder in the yellow slicker appears, grabbing Freddie's feet, pulling her underwater. She drowns.

The next morning, Christmas Day, Chris (Sally Field) discovers Freddie's body in the tub. She screams. As the others enter, Alex accuses Elizabeth of poisoning Freddie, a claim she denies. Chris dials the police only to find the phone dead. So she walks through a wooded area to use a neighbor's phone. On the way, though, Chris finds she's being followed by a figure in a yellow slicker outfit. After eluding her nemesis, she returns to the farmhouse. Upon arriving, she notices Alex's car still inside the barn. While investigating, she stumbles upon Jo's dead body. Elizabeth appears suddenly from outside, telling her to come with her. Instead, Chris panics, runs inside the house, locks the door, and discovers Benjamin dead. Chris screams, bolts from the house, and flags down a passing car—which turns out to be driven by Alex. Chris explains that Elizabeth has murdered everyone, but Alex confesses she is the actual killer. Suffering from childhood persecution fantasies resulting in an extreme resentment of her siblings, Alex handily set up stepmother Elizabeth as a patsy. She then assaults Chris with a tire iron, her body falling down the hill and out of sight. Hoping to complete the frame-up on Elizabeth, Alex invites investigators to accompany her to the farmhouse. However, Alex sails into hysteria upon seeing Chris still alive. Chris watches the police lead Alex away. In the end, Elizabeth is left to tend to the Morgan farmhouse alone.

Cast
 Jessica Walter as Frederica (Freddie) Morgan
 Sally Field as Christine (Chris) Morgan
 Eleanor Parker as Alexandra (Alex) Morgan
 Julie Harris as Elizabeth Hall Morgan
 Walter Brennan as Benjamin Morgan
 Jill Haworth as Joanna (Jo) Morgan
 John Fink as Dr. Ted Lindsay
 Med Flory as Sheriff Nolan

Release
The film debuted on the American Broadcasting Company on November 28, 1972, as part of the ABC Movie of the Week series.

Home media
The film was released on DVD by Echo Bridge Home Entertainment on May 7, 2013, as a part of its "8 Midnight Horror Movies" pack. Echo Bridge later re-released the film on September 9, 2014, and on June 23, 2015.

Reception
A psychological interpretation of Home for the Holidays''' storyline can be found in David Deal's critique, from his book Television Fright Films of the 1970s. He notes that the four Morgan daughters in the film all have masculine first-names, implying that "the father had always wanted sons and was therefore unforgiving of his progeny, [causing] the break in family ties." However, Deal also notes that "such subtleties are admirable but unnecessary" considering the movie's chief purpose was to frighten TV audiences. The author goes on to assail John Llewelyn Moxie's direction as being strictly pedestrian, with "very little visual flair or suspense, where a touch of either would have gone a long way."

However, critic Howard Thompson of the New York Times was less sparing in his criticism, published the morning of the film's prime-time premiere. According to his article, "you never saw a grislier, wetter and flatter Yuletide meatball in the guise of a thriller." Ticking off the body count and describing how each victim is murdered, Thompson finally observes that "[if] you...really care whodunit, simply pick the shiftiest pair of eyes on the premises. This is a Christmas present? Somebody's got to be kidding."

Justin Kerswell from Hysteria Lives! awarded the film 4/5 stars, writing, "Perhaps the film sails too close to soap opera histrionics at times... However, the performances are roundly so good that this doesn't matter, plus the story just keeps twisting and turning."

Brett Gallman from Oh, the Horror! wrote, "Unfolding like a film adaptation of an Agatha Christie play, Home For the Holidays'' often feels stagebound and hemmed up; if not for beating the “Christmas horrors” out of the gate, I suspect it may be even more obscure than it already is, despite all of the talent involved. As it stands, it's a movie you'll probably hear about this time every year when horror fans begin to discuss the holiday-tinged offerings, and this is one of the last courses you'll ever need to digest."

References

External links
 
 
 
 
Home for the Holidays: The Terror Trap

1972 television films
1972 films
1970s Christmas horror films
1970s Christmas films
1970s slasher films
ABC Movie of the Week
ABC Motion Pictures films
American Christmas horror films
American slasher films
Christmas television films
Films with screenplays by Joseph Stefano
Films produced by Aaron Spelling
Films directed by John Llewellyn Moxey
American horror television films
1970s American films